Fetisovo is a village located in Kazakhstan on the coast of the Caspian Sea. The European route E121 passes by the area.

References

Populated places on the Caspian Sea